My Mister is a 2018 South Korean television series starring Lee Sun-kyun and Lee Ji-eun. The series was directed by Kim Won-seok, written by Park Hae-young and produced by Chorokbaem Media. It aired on tvN from March 21 to May 17, 2018, on Wednesdays and Thursdays at 21:30 (KST) time slot.

The drama received critical acclaim, winning Best Drama at the 55th Baeksang Arts Awards. It is currently available on Netflix and iQIYI.

Synopsis

My Mister tells the story of an impoverished and debt-laden young woman (IU) struggling to stay afloat as she nurses her deaf, sick grandmother and working a temporary job. She develops an unlikely bond with one of her equally miserable supervisors (Lee Sun-kyun), which is subjected to scrutiny and manipulation by their colleagues, friends, and dysfunctional families. Enduring the weight of their respective lives, they come together, forming new relationships, keeping parts of themselves secret — but ultimately healing one another's past scars.

Cast

Main
 Lee Sun-kyun as Park Dong-hoon
 The second oldest of the three brothers and the most successful out of the three brothers. He works as a structural engineer and always has a safety-first approach to life. He is quiet and stoic, but also goes all in for the people he loves. He grows to care for Ji-an despite having a conflict with her at first.
 Lee Ji-eun as Lee Ji-an
Kim Gyu-ri as child Ji-an
 Born on 4 November 1998. Ji-an is a 21-year-old woman who is enduring many hardships in life, including the need to discharge her mother's huge debts and taking care of her deaf grandmother. She was also convicted of murdering a loan shark (also Lee Kwang-il's father) during her middle school years. She is tasked by her boss who runs a company she is temporarily working for to discover Park Dong-hoon's weaknesses, but she soon ends up falling for his warm charms and learns to trust someone for the first time.

Supporting

Dong-hoon's family
 Go Doo-shim as Byun Yo-soon
 A loving mother with three sons who worries about her eldest living apart from his family, and her youngest, who has yet to get married despite being over 40.
 Park Ho-san as Park Sang-hoon
 Dong-hoon's eldest brother. He is a middle-aged man who was fired from his job and then ran two failing businesses, which ended up in him being chased out of his own home. Though he has to live under his mother's roof, he's a romanticist at heart who always thinks about ways to find happiness.
 Song Sae-byeok as Park Ki-hoon
 Dong-hoon's younger brother. He was once seen as a genius director because an independent film he shot when he was twenty was invited to the Cannes Film Festival. However, 20 years have passed since his glory days. He has yet to successfully launch his career as a movie director.
 Lee Ji-ah as Kang Yoon-hee, Park Dong-hoon's wife, who is having an affair with Do Joon-young, her husband's boss who is younger than him.
  as Jo Ae-ryun.

Lee Ji-an's family
  as Lee Bong-ae: Lee Ji-an's deaf grandmother.

People around Lee Ji-an
 Jang Ki-yong as Lee Kwang-il
 A loan shark, who liked Ji-an when he was young. As his father was murdered by Ji-an (who was jailed two years for this crime) while chasing her for debts, he hated Ji-an for this and tormented her greatly over her debts.
 Ahn Seung-gyun as Song Ki-bum
 Ji-an's best friend who is obsessed with computer games.
  as Seo Choon-dae: An elderly man and cleaner who is caring towards Ji-an.

People in the company
 Kim Young-min as Do Joon-young
 Dong-hoon's college junior and Ji-an's boss, currently working as a CEO. He has an affair with Yoon-hee and seeks to fire Dong-hoon.
 Shin Goo as Chairman Jang Hoe-jang
  as Executive Director Yoon Sang-tae
 Seo Hyun-woo as Head of Section Seo
  as Kim Dae-ri
  as Yeo Hyung-kyu
  as Jung Chae-ryung
 Dong-hoon and Ji-an's co-worker.

Extended
 Kwon Nara as Choi Yoo-ra
 A movie actress, and Park Ki-hoon's love interest.
 Park Hae-joon as Gyum-duk
 Dong-hoon's friend and has dated Jung-hee in the past.
 Oh Na-ra as Jung-hee
 Owner of Jung-hee's Bar, friends with Dong-hoon.
  as Director Jung Chang-mo
 Park Soo-young as Je-cheol
 Seo Sang-won as  Go Jin-beom, friends with Dong-hoon.

Production
On November 8, 2017, news outlets reported that Lee Sun-kyun and IU would play the leads in My Mister, directed by Kim Won-seok of Misaeng and Signal, and written by Park Hae-young of Another Miss Oh. Both tvN and IU's agency commented that nothing had been finalized; the main cast was confirmed on November 13 with the addition of Oh Dal-su and Song Sae-byeok as Lee Sun-kyun's character's brothers, and Na Moon-hee as the mother of the three. IU accepted the part of Lee Ji-an because she was interested in working with director Kim Won-seok and because the silent, tense role differed from the cheerful and cute characters she had previously portrayed.

In December, Jang Ki-yong, Lee Ji-ah, Kim Young-min, Jung Young-joo and Kwon Na-ra joined the series. On February 19, 2018, Na Moon-hee was replaced by Go Doo-shim due to schedule conflicts. At the end of the month, Oh Dal-su left the series following allegations of sexual abuse and Park Ho-san took over.

The cast gathered for the first script reading on December 18, 2017. Filming was scheduled to partly pre-produce the drama, but ended up protracted, having to reshoot Oh Dal-su's scenes and due to the setting predominantly nocturnal: episodes 13 and 14, scheduled for May 2 and 3, 2018, were postponed for a week to let the cast and staff rest, and filming ended on May 15, one day before the airing of the last two episodes.

Original soundtrack

Part 1
Part 2
Part 3
Part 4
Part 5
Part 6
Part 7
Part 8

Reception
Prior to airing, IU's casting sparked protests from the audience due to the age difference of the main characters, a man in his forties and a woman in her twenties, and for the possibility of romance between them, to which the production replied that the dynamic would be that of two people healing their wounds through each other's lives.

After the first episode aired, My Mister was accused of glorifying dating violence due to a scene where loan shark Kwang-il assaults Ji-an, who replies "Do you like me?", and because Kwang-il's official description said he bothered Ji-an as it was the only way to make her see him. The Korea Communications Standards Commission commented that a number of complaints had been received and that it was checking them, while the production team replied that the complicated relationship between the two characters would be resolved gradually and to be patient. IU herself intervened, saying, "Kwang-il and Ji-an have the most conflictual relationship. How could you love someone so violent?"

Despite the production's reassurance about the relationship between the two main leads, the press continued to harbor doubts: television critic Kim Seon-yeong commented that the series, arguing that middle-aged men were misunderstood, was merely excusing the problematic behavior of those who tried to approach young women on the subway or on the street. Hwang Jin-mi of The Hankyoreh felt that Ji-an's reaction to the beating made it appear that she accepted that sadistic communication method, creating the illusion that she needed someone to rescue her from the gender-based violence perpetrated by a peer in an "heinous negative strategy" aimed at glamorizing a middle-aged man who was not particularly handsome or rich; she also felt it demeaned the appearance of middle-aged women through their own mouths, conveying the notion that it was natural for mature men to prefer young women. Park Woo-sung of The Women's News commented that the direction itself tried to make it seem that Ji-an and Dong-hoon were bound by fate, beautifying and disguising with good intentions, emotional gazes and a miraculous aura what in fact configured as a slavery in which the woman saw her right to self-determination restricted to a minimum, concluding that it illustrated "the insidious desire of the patriarchal system to somehow drive women to a position of defeat and imprison them in the men's sphere of sight until the end."

Real News instead observed that the first two episodes had managed to demonstrate the intention of depicting the process of mutual understanding between characters of different generations and genders who were at odds with each other, while pop culture critic Jung Deok-hyun called My Mister "a survival thriller." He later added that the intent of the series was to depict the pursuit of happiness in hell.

In a press conference held on April 11, 2018, the director and the actors addressed the various controversies: they explained that the title, translatable with "My middle-aged man," did not imply a romantic relationship, but rather the consideration that the other person was precious, and that violence, theft or wiretapping were only narrative tools.

Overcome the age difference controversies and the accusations of misogyny and violence, My Mister ended with the support of the public and the critics, who called it "a life drama" centered on people and one of the best series of the year. Ji-an was praised by the press for not being a poor and helpless heroine, but able to grasp the whole situation and create an advantageous situation for herself, taking matters into her own hands. The directing and the actors' performances were praised, and IU was complimented for effortlessly digesting a character tired of living a harsh life.

Seo Byung-gi of the Korea Herald Business commented that the series made him think about life, family and society, and noted that Dong-hoon and Ji-an, while not in a romantic relationship, were "wonderfully connected" by their wounds. Huffington Post Korea and Sports Hankook wrote that it talked about the meeting of broken people of different ages and genders, blurring the lines between the many barriers of today's society and showing how human solidarity led to demolishing one's walls and discovering that the world was a warmer place than expected. Critic Yoon Seok-jin felt that My Mister was a shock to viewers due to its realistic depiction of a problematic reality that they wanted to avoid.

The Chosun Ilbo and The Korea Herald identified the depiction of a life no different from that experienced by ordinary people as the reason for the success of My Mister, and that the characters facing "real wars" such as unemployment, job insecurity, job hunting, divorce and extramarital affairs had touched the hearts of the viewers "with a painfully bleak but warm impression," celebrating a world in which it was difficult to live, but which could be made bearable and happy if you had someone by your side. Lee Do-yeon of Yonhap News added that it had demonstrated that people separated like islands could build a bridge-like bond through compassion and understanding, and that the show's message was that people could comfort and understand each other because everyone harbored pain in their hearts.

However, some newspapers expressed negative opinions even at the end of the series: critic Lee Seung-han found that pairing a young woman in need of attention with a middle-aged man to tell a story of mutual consolation was not the right choice, considering the disrespectful portrayal of both groups, with the former leading flat lives and the latter portrayed as regressive. GQ Korea's Hwang Hyo-jin felt that My Mister, in trying to make an ordinary middle-aged man the main character, repeatedly exhibited Ji-an's hardships to shine a spotlight on Dong-hoon, elected as her savior, in a sadistic narrative in which Ji-an got hurt in almost every episode and which was further enhanced by the fact that she was portrayed by IU, whose petite appearance made her look much younger; she further judged that Ji-an's bold approach towards the man and her initial attempt to seduce him against his will provided a justification to those men who, in reality, committed sexual violence, but accused women of having instigated them.

The script of the series, which went on sale in 2022, registered more than  pre-orders, ranking fourth on Kyobo Book's best-sellers list and becoming the second best-selling drama script of the year; 55% of the buyers were men who sympathized with Park Dong-hoon's character.

Viewership
This series airs on tvN, a cable channel/pay TV which normally has a relatively smaller audience compared to free-to-air TV/public broadcasters (KBS, SBS, MBC and EBS). The drama was a critical and commercial success, consistently topping the cable television viewership ratings in its time slot. While it began with ratings of 3-4%, deemed below expectations due to, according to Yonhap News, the too heavy atmosphere, it reached 6% with episode 12. Its final episode recorded a with 7.352% nationwide audience share according to Nielsen paid platform making the episode one of the highest rated in Korean cable television history at the time. My Mister drew a solid average viewership rating of 5% for a cable TV show and topped the Contents Power Index (CPI) rankings, as well as the TV popularity ranking, six times during its nine week run.

Awards and nominations

References

External links
  

 My Mister at Studio Dragon 
 My Mister at Chorokbaem Media 

Korean-language television shows
TVN (South Korean TV channel) television dramas
2018 South Korean television series debuts
Television series by Studio Dragon
Television series by Chorokbaem Media
2018 South Korean television series endings